Marius Niculai (born 20 April 1979) in Constanța, is a former Romanian rugby union football player. He played as a No. 8.

Club career
During his career, Niculai played for Farul Constanța in Romania, and for Stade lavelanétien and SC Pamiers all in France.

International career
Niculai gathered 2 caps for Romania, both of them in 2003. He was a member of his national side for the 6th  Rugby World Cup in 2003, where he played two matches in Pool A against Ireland and against the host country, the Wallabies.

References

External links

1979 births
Living people
Romanian rugby union players
Romania international rugby union players
Rugby union number eights
RCJ Farul Constanța players
People from Constanța
Expatriate rugby union players in France